Kadirgamapillai (Kathirkamar) Nallainathan (18 February 1945 – 16 July 1989; commonly known by the nom de guerre Uma Maheswaran) was a Sri Lankan Tamil rebel and founder/leader of the People's Liberation Organisation of Tamil Eelam (PLOTE), a separatist Tamil militant organisation in Sri Lanka.

Early life
Maheswaran was born on 18 February 1945 and was from Varuthalaivilan near Tellippalai in northern Sri Lanka. He worked for the government as a surveyor.

LTTE
Maheswaran joined the militant Liberation Tigers of Tamil Eelam (LTTE) in 1977. The LTTE gave him the nom de guerre Mukundan. He was chairman of the LTTE's central committee from 1977 to 1980. He received military training in Lebanon and Syria. Maheswaran and LTTE leader V. Prabhakaran were blamed for the shooting of MP M. Canagaratnam on 24 January 1978. In 1982 A Sri Lankan court sentenced Maheswaran, in absentia, to 15 years rigorous imprisonment for the attempted murder.

Maheswaran fell out with Prabhakaran and in 1980 he left the organisation.

PLOTE
After leaving the LTTE, Maheswaran founded the People's Liberation Organisation of Tamil Eelam (PLOTE). On the night of 19 May 1982 Maheswaran along fellow PLOTE members Jotheeswaran and Sivaneswaran (Nirnajan) were involved in a shootout with Prabhakaran and Raghavan (Sivakumar) of the LTTE at the Pondy bazaar in Thiyagarayanagar, Madras, India. Jotheeswaran was injured and hospitalised but Maheswaran and Sivaneswaran escaped. Maheswaran was arrested near Gummidipoondi railway station on 25 May 1982 after a shoot out with the police but was later bailed. Maheswaran and PLOTE carried out bank robberies and kidnappings to finance their activities. Maheswaran's actions led to divisions within PLOTE and number of splinter groups were formed including the Eelam National Democratic Liberation Front (ENDLF). Maheswaran dealt harshly with dissension and is alleged to have carried out 38 murders.

Maheswaran was involved in the failed 1988 Maldives Coup. On 16 July 1989 Maheswaran was abducted by six men in Colombo. His bullet ridden body was later found on Frankfurt Place, Bambalapitiya, near the Maldivian High Commission. The ENDLF, an Indian backed offshoot of PLOTE, claimed responsibility for the assassination. Some sources blamed the assassination on disgruntled members of PLOTE.

References

1945 births
1989 deaths
Liberation Tigers of Tamil Eelam members
People from Northern Province, Sri Lanka
People from British Ceylon
People's Liberation Organisation of Tamil Eelam militants
People killed during the Sri Lankan Civil War
Sri Lankan Tamil rebels
Sri Lankan Tamil surveyors
Indian Peace Keeping Force